The year 2018 in architecture involved some significant architectural events and new buildings.

Events

January 9 – The Church of St. Lambertus, Immerath, Germany, is demolished.
June 15 – The second major fire in four years breaks out at Glasgow School of Art.
August 14 – The Ponte Morandi, a road viaduct in Genoa, collapses, resulting in 43 deaths and numerous injuries.

Buildings and structures

China
 Hong Kong–Zhuhai–Macau Bridge opened October 23.
 Goldin Finance 117, Tianjin, the third tallest building in China, designed by P & T Group and ECADI, projected for completion.

Denmark
 Fjordenhus, Kirk Kapital headquarters, on Vejle Fjord, designed by Olafur Eliasson and Sebastian Behmann, completed.

Finland
 Helsinki Central Library Oodi, designed by ALA Architects, opened December 5.

France
 Sir John Monash Centre in Villers-Bretonneux officially opened April 24.
 Musée de la Romanité, Nîmes

Hong Kong
 Hong Kong–Zhuhai–Macau Bridge opened October 23.

Ireland
 Pálás cinema, Galway, designed by Tom de Paor, opened February 23.

Malaysia
 Four Seasons Place Kuala Lumpur, the third tallest building in Malaysia, projected for completion.

Norway
 Ureddplassen public toilet, designed by Haugen/Zohar Arkitekter + Landskapsfabrikken, opened.

Russia 
 Crimean Bridge between Crimea and Russia, the longest bridge in Europe, the road section of the bridge opened May 16.
 Lakhta Center, in St. Petersburg, the tallest building in Europe, commissioning begins June 27.

Spain
 Mac House (Casa Mac), Novelda, designed by La Errería.

Sweden
 Norra Tornen (Northern Towers) eastern residential tower, Stockholm, designed by OMA, completed.

Taiwan
 Weiwuying (National Kaohsiung Centre for the Arts), Kaohsiung, designed by Mecanoo, opened October 13.

Turkey
 Troy Museum, designed by Yalın Mimarlık, opened October 10.
 Istanbul Airport with the future world’s largest terminal, officially opened October 29.

 Ukraine
 Chernobyl New Safe Confinement completed.

United Kingdom
 Broomlands Primary School in Kelso, Scottish Borders, designed by Stallan-Brand, opened January 9.
 Storey's Field Community Centre and Nursery for the University of Cambridge at Eddington, designed by Stuart McKnight of MUMA (McInnes Usher McKnight Architects), completed c. March.
 Beecroft Building for the University of Oxford Department of Physics, designed by Hawkins\Brown, officially opened September 17.
 The Hubert Perrodo Building at St Peter's College, Oxford, by Design Engine Architects, officially opened March 13.
 Queen's Diamond Jubilee Galleries in Westminster Abbey, London, designed by MUMA (McInnes Usher McKnight Architects) and Max Fordham, opened to public June 11.
 V&A Museum of Design Dundee in Dundee, Scotland, designed by Kengo Kuma, opened September 15.
 Coal Drops Yard at King's Cross Central in London, conversion of industrial premises to retail development by Thomas Heatherwick, opened October 26.
 Gloucester Bus Station, designed by Building Design Partnership, opened October 26–28.
 The Macallan distillery, Craigellachie, Moray, Scotland, designed by Rogers Stirk Harbour + Partners, new building opened.
 Nevill Holt Opera within 17th century stable block, designed by Witherford Watson Mann, opened June 14.

 Mapleton Crescent, Wandsworth (high-rise prefabricated apartments), designed by Metropolitan Workshop.
 Wittering House, Finsbury Park, home for self by Charles Bettes of GPad London, completed.
 House in the Garden, Notting Hill, London, designed by Gianni Botsford, completed.

United States
Amazon Spheres in Seattle, designed by NBBJ, opened January 30.
Institute for Contemporary Art at VCU in Richmond, Virginia designed by Steven Holl opened April 21.
Stir restaurant at the Philadelphia Museum of Art (architectural interior) designed by Frank Gehry opened October 12.
3 World Trade Center in New York City, designed by Rogers Stirk Harbour + Partners, opened June 11.

Vietnam
 Landmark 81 in Ho Chi Minh City the tallest building in Vietnam and the tallest completed building in Southeast Asia, is completed.

Exhibitions
26 May until 25 November -  The 16th Venice Biennale of Architecture in Venice, Italy
15 July until 13 January 2019 -  "Towards a Concrete Utopia: Architecture in Yugoslavia 1948-1980" at MOMA in New York City.

Awards
AIA Gold Medal – James Stewart Polshek
Architecture Firm Award AIA – Snow Kreilich Architects
Driehaus Architecture Prize for New Classical Architecture – Marc Breitman & Nada Breitman-Jakov
Emporis Skyscraper Award – MGM Cotai
Lawrence Israel Prize - Annabelle Selldorf
Pritzker Architecture Prize – Balkrishna Doshi
RAIA Gold Medal – Alexander Tzannes
RIBA Royal Gold Medal – Neave Brown
Stirling Prize – Foster and Partners for Bloomberg London
Thomas Jefferson Medal in Architecture – Sir David Adjaye
Vincent Scully Prize – Inga Saffron and Robert Campbell

Deaths

January 7 – Aydın Boysan, 96, Turkish architect
January 9 – Neave Brown, 88, American-born British architect
January 17 – Ted McCoy, 92, New Zealand architect
February 18 – Ivor Smith, 93, English architect
February 19 – Teresa Gisbert Carbonell, 91, Bolivian architect and art historian
February 20 – Lionel March, 84, British architect and mathematician
February 22 – Serban Cantacuzino, 90, French-born Romanian-British architect
April 26 – David Mitchell, 77, New Zealand architect
May 12 – Will Alsop, 70, British architect
May 18 – Tom Wolfe, 88, American author and architecture critic (From Bauhaus to Our House)
May 28 – Wang Da-hong, 100, Chinese born Taiwanese architect
August 19 – Rafael Calventi, 92, Dominican architect and diplomat
August 26 – Kerry Hill, 75, Australian architect
September 13 – Shlomo Aronson, 81, Israeli landscape architect
September 18 – Robert Venturi, 93, American architect, Pritzker Prize winner (1991) and co-author with Denise Scott Brown of Learning from Las Vegas
October 11 – Paul Andreu, 80, French  architect (Osaka Maritime Museum)
November 24 – Gene Leedy, 90, American architect
December 27 – Jean Dumontier, 83, Canadian-Quebecois architect and artist (the Montreal Metro stations Jean-Drapeau and Longueuil-Université-de-Sherbrooke)

See also
Timeline of architecture

References

 
21st-century architecture
2018-related lists